Johan Emil Aro (1874–1928) was a Finnish entomologist.

Aro was a school teacher in Viborg . He worked mainly on Ephemeroptera.

Works
Partial list

1910: Piirteitä päiväkorennoisten (Ephemeridae) elämäntavoista ja kehityksestä. - Viipurin suomalaisen realilyseon vuosikertomus, p. 1-32.
1928: Suomen päivänkorennoiset (Ephemerida). - Otavan hyönteiskirjasia 3 / Vanamon kirjoja 27:1-68.

References
Uunio Saalas: Suomalaisista hyönteisnimistä. Acta Forestalia Fennica, 1934, 40. vsk, nro 27, s. 641–672. Suomen metsätieteellinen seura.
Silfverberg, H. 1989: Lists of the insect types in the Zoological Museum, University of Helsinki. 10. Ephemeroptera. Acta Entomol. Fennica 55:1-2.

Finnish entomologists
1874 births
1928 deaths
Finnish educators